Julius A. Smith (died February 27, 1935) was an American architect. He designed buildings listed on the National Register of Historic Places like Hotel Brigham in Brigham City with Francis Charles Woods and Peery Apartments in Ogden with Leslie Simmons Hodgson.

References

1935 deaths
People from Ogden, Utah
Architects from Utah
20th-century American architects